Christopher Charles Wood (born April 14, 1988) is an American actor. He is known for his role as Kai Parker in the sixth season of the CW's television series The Vampire Diaries in 2014, after previously appearing on The CW's The Carrie Diaries in the role of writer Adam Weaver in 2013. He also starred in the 2016 CW television series Containment in the starring role of Atlanta police officer Jake Riley. From 2016 to 2018, he played Mon-El on the CW superhero series Supergirl. In 2021, Wood voiced He-Man in Masters of the Universe: Revelation. In 2022, he played Russell Hammond in the Broadway musical Almost Famous.

Early life
Wood was born in Dublin, Ohio. He attended Elon University in Elon, North Carolina, where he graduated in 2010, with a Bachelor of Fine Arts degree in Music Theater. He has been friends with actor Grant Gustin since college.

Career
After graduation, he played Melchior in the 2010–2011 national tour of Spring Awakening and Prince Eric in The Little Mermaid in August 2011 at the Music Theatre of Wichita. He also played Joe Hardy in Paper Mill Playhouse's production of Damn Yankees in 2012, which later played at the 5th Avenue Theatre.

He made his film debut in a made-for-TV movie entitled Browsers in early 2013. In August 2013, producers of The Carrie Diaries announced that Wood would join the show in its second season, which was cancelled by The CW in May 2014.

Wood appeared as the recurring role of Malachai Parker on season six of The Vampire Diaries; he returned to the role in a guest appearance in the eighth and final season of The Vampire Diaries. He reprised the role in the second season of the spinoff series Legacies in 2020. He appeared also in a guest role as Paul, in the episode "Beach House" of Girls in 2014.

In 2015, Wood was cast in The CW drama series Containment, portraying officer Jake Riley, and gained 30 pounds for the role. The series was canceled in early 2016 after 13 episodes. In April 2016, Wood was cast in a 2-episode role on the second season of the PBS period drama Mercy Street. In July 2016, he was cast as a series regular in the role of Mon-El for the second season of Supergirl,. Following heavy viewer backlash to the character, Wood left the series at the end of the third season. He would briefly reprise the role for the 100th episode, "It's a Super Life", and the series finale, "Kara".

In 2020, Wood was cast in the pilot for Thirtysomething(else), a sequel to the ABC drama Thirtysomething, in which he would have played Leo Steadman, Hope's (Mel Harris) and Michael's (Ken Olin) son. The network did not pick up the series for air however, citing budget issues and lack of "star power within the new leads". On February 24, 2020, Wood was revealed to be playing Prince Adam and He-Man in Masters of the Universe: Revelation, with its first half released July 23, 2021, and its second on November 23 that same year. On June 2, 2022, it was announced that Wood would be playing Russell Hammond in Almost Famous, a musical based on the film, opening on Broadway in October 2022. After mixed reviews and a 74% average seating capacity, the show announced in December that it would be closing with its last performance January 8, 2023. In March 2023, the short film Snowshoe, which Wood wrote, directed, and stars in, with The Flashs Grant Gustin, was released on YouTube.

Personal life
When Wood was in his early twenties, his father died due to an untreated mental health condition that resulted in psychotic symptoms. His death was the culmination of a manic episode that eventually led to heart failure. Wood believes he was not able to get his father the help he needed soon enough because of the stigma and lack of awareness around mental health.

Since his father's death, Wood has become an active ambassador for mental health awareness and member of the Board of Directors for Mental Health America. In October 2017, he launched a mental health awareness campaign and website “IDONTMIND” that works to decrease stigma around mental health and provide resources and education.

In 2016, Wood met co-star Melissa Benoist on the set of Supergirl, after joining the cast for season two and their relationship was confirmed in 2017. They announced their engagement on Instagram on February 10, 2019. The two married in Ojai, California, on September 1, 2023. On March 4, 2020, the couple announced on Instagram that they were expecting their first child. They announced the birth of their son in September 2020.

Filmography

Awards and nominations

References

External links

 
 

1988 births
21st-century American male actors
American male television actors
Elon University alumni
Living people
People from Dublin, Ohio
Male actors from Ohio